Henning Jeschke is a German climate activist, and part of the activists group Last Generation. He used to study political science.

Jeschke received considerable press coverage in 2021 being part of a hunger strike shortly before the federal elections in Germany. The strikers had called on the three main chancellor candidates to publicly discuss measures against the climate crisis. Lina Eichler collapsed and was, like others, sent to hospital. The strike ended after four weeks when Olaf Scholz agreed to hold a conversation within the next month.

The activist group Last Generation was formed by participants of the hunger strike, and Jeschke is seen as one of the group's main initiators. The group generated public discussions in Germany by blocking highways until February 2022 to raise awareness of food waste among the German public.

In August 2020, Jeschke and two other activists blocked an airplane from lifting off by gluing themselves to it. Jeschke was charged with coercion and expected the court to judge on climate emergency, but the case was dropped unconditionally at the request of the prosecution.

The Last Generation group obtained funding from a group in California to continue to protest against the burning of oil, gas and coal. Lina Eicher and Jeschke were interviewed to celebrate the group's first birthday.

As one of the main leaders of the group, which is suspected to be a criminal association, Jeschke was judged and his home was raided twice.

References

German environmentalists
German activists
Date of birth missing (living people)
Year of birth missing (living people)
Living people